LGBT Health is a bimonthly peer-reviewed academic journal covering healthcare as it relates to LGBT individuals, the only peer-reviewed journal of its kind. It was established in 2014 and is published by Mary Ann Liebert, Inc. The editor-in-chief is William Byne (Icahn School of Medicine at Mount Sinai). According to the Journal Citation Reports, the journal has a 2017 impact factor of 2.514.

References

External links

Mary Ann Liebert academic journals
Sexology journals
Publications established in 2014
Bimonthly journals
LGBT-related journals
English-language journals
LGBT and health care